The Metropolitan Province was a multi-member electoral province of the Western Australian Legislative Council, located in the metropolitan region of Perth. It was created by the Constitution Acts Amendment Act 1893, and became effective on 22 May 1894 following the first council elections following the granting of responsible government to Western Australia. The seat was safe for the Liberal Party and its predecessors.

Until the 1950 elections, it covered Perth's central business district and nearby environs, but moved at that point to the western and northern suburbs while still extending to include Perth itself. In 1963–1964, electoral changes to the Legislative Council, which abolished the 10 three-member seats and created 15 two-member seats in their place, resulted in the seat shrinking into the wealthy western suburbs region. Thereafter, it was a safe seat for the Liberal Party. In 1989, the province was abolished by the Acts Amendment (Electoral Reform) Act 1987, and with two others became part of the North Metropolitan Region under the new proportional voting system.

Geography
The province was made up of several complete Legislative Assembly districts, which changed at each distribution. It had a more restrictive franchise than the Legislative Assembly, however, so not all voters in the corresponding Assembly districts were eligible to vote in the Council.

Representation

Members

 Three-member seat

 Two-member seat

References
 

Former electoral provinces of Western Australia